Bachórzec  is a village in the administrative district of Gmina Dubiecko, within Przemyśl County, Subcarpathian Voivodeship, in south-eastern Poland.

The village has a population of 950.

References

Villages in Przemyśl County